Ronald Collins is the name of:

Ronald K. L. Collins (born 1949), American scholar and lawyer
Ronald F. Collins, Maine politician
Ronald Stewart Collins, Jr. (1956–2016), Canadian curler